Gottfried (Maximilian Maria) Prinz zu Hohenlohe-Waldenburg-Schillingfürst, Ratibor und Corvey (8 November 1867 – 7 November 1932), was an Austro-Hungarian army officer and diplomat during World War I. He was the grandson of Princess Carolyne zu Sayn-Wittgenstein.

Life 

Prince Hohenlohe-Schillingsfürst was born in Vienna on 8 November 1867 to Lord High Steward Prince Konstantin of Hohenlohe-Schillingsfürst (1828–1896) and was the brother of Konrad Prinz zu Hohenlohe-Schillingsfürst, who was Prime Minister of Austria in 1906 and who too would become Lord High Steward in 1917. He married Archduchess Maria Henrietta, daughter of Archduke Friedrich who was the Supreme Commander of the Austro-Hungarian army during World War I, on 3 June 1908 in Baden. They had three children.

Following graduation from the Schottengymnasium in Vienna, Prince Hohenlohe-Schillingsfürst entered the army as a hussar in 1887. Promoted to lieutenant in 1889, he attended the War Academy from 1893 to 1895, followed by duty with the General Staff. In 1900, he was promoted to captain and was sent to St. Petersburg as military attaché in 1902. In 1906, he was promoted to the post of major, but retired the following year and transferred to the foreign service. However, he had to leave the service in 1908 due to his engagement with the Archduchess. On 2 February 1913, Emperor Franz Joseph I entrusted Prince Hohenlohe-Schillingsfürst with a special mission to St. Petersburg designed to alleviate the strained relations arising out of the Balkan crisis in the winter of 1912–1913. In April 1914, he re-entered the diplomatic corps while his wife had to renounce her title 'Her Imperial and Royal Highness'. 

On 4 August 1914, Emperor Franz Joseph I appointed Prince Hohenlohe-Schillingsfürst as ambassador of the Dual Monarchy at Berlin, replacing the ageing and decrepit Count von Szögyény-Marich, an appointment that had been discussed long before the advent of war but blocked by the latter's refusal to make a graceful exit. He was an ardent supporter of the Dual Alliance of 1879 and he sought to maintain the alliance on the basis of equality. The deteriorating military fortunes of the Dual Monarchy, however, hampered his endeavours in that regard. In 1917, he was convinced that military victory was out of reach and that a peace settlement had to be found as soon as possible; thus he supported the unsuccessful attempts of the new Emperor Karl I to bring about a separate peace. 

Following the end of the war, Prince Hohenlohe-Schillingsfürst retired from public service and devoted his remaining years to horse racing. 

In 1917, he had been promoted to the position of a major-general on the retired list. He was invested as a Knight of the Order of the Golden Fleece in 1917.

He died in Vienna on 7 November 1932.

Notes

References

External links
 'Hohenlohe-Schillingsfürst Gottfried Prinz zu', Österreichisches Biographisches Lexikon 1815-1950

1867 births
1932 deaths
Austro-Hungarian diplomats of World War I
Austro-Hungarian military personnel of World War I
Ambassadors of Austria-Hungary to Germany
Austrian diplomats
Austrian princes
Knights of the Golden Fleece of Austria